Xiahe is a county in Gannan Tibetan Autonomous Prefecture, Gansu province, the People's Republic of China, bordering Qinghai province to the west. It is home to the famed Labrang Tibetan Buddhist monastery, one of the largest Tibetan Buddhist monasteries outside the Tibet Autonomous Region. The town is populated largely by ethnic Tibetans, as well as some Hui and Han Chinese. The area is highly rural and pastoral (including yak and other animal rearing). The geography is mountainous. In recent years it has become a tourist attraction. The county was named Xiahe in 1928, after the Daxia River that flows through its territory.

History
Xiahe (Sangqu) used to be part of Qinghai when it was under the control of Chinese Muslim General Ma Qi. It was the site of bloody battles between Muslim and Tibetan forces.

Location
Xiahe (Sangqu) is found in the southern portion of Gansu province, along the western border with Qinghai province. It lies along the Daxia and Zhao rivers. It is on the northeast edge of the Tibetan Plateau.

Climate
Xiahe County has an alpine subarctic climate (Köppen Dwc) that grades into an alpine climate (ETH) at the highest elevations. The climate is characterised by mild, rainy summers and frigid, but dry and sunny, winters.

Name
The name (both Chinese and Tibetan), which literally means "Xia River", refers to the Daxia River which runs through the county.

Administrative divisions
Towns:
Labuleng / Labrang, Wangge'ertang, Amuquhu, Sangke, Ganjia, Madang, Bola, Kecai

Townships:
Damai, Qu'ao, Tanggai'ang, Zhayou, Jicang

Other areas:
Xiahe County Seed Station, Xiahe County Jisi General Station, Xiahe County Sangke Sheep Farm

See also
Baishiya Karst Cave

References

External links

People's Government of Xiahe Official Website Chinese version
People's Government of Xiahe Official Website English version
Journey through China - A site with numerous pictures of Xiahe.
The Nomadic Spirit – Picture Gallery of Xiahe

 
County-level divisions of Gansu
Gannan Tibetan Autonomous Prefecture